The Phu Quoc bent-toed gecko (Cyrtodactylus phuquocensis) is a species of gecko that is endemic to southwestern Vietnam.

References 

Cyrtodactylus
Reptiles described in 2010